Sannosawa No.2 Dam  is an earthfill dam located in Hokkaido Prefecture in Japan. The dam is used for irrigation. The catchment area of the dam is 1.9 km2. The dam impounds about 6  ha of land when full and can store 700 thousand cubic meters of water. The construction of the dam was started on 1953 and completed in 1954.

References

Dams in Hokkaido